Maria Alexandrovna Stepanova (born 23 February 1979) is a Russian professional and Olympic basketball player. In the United States, she played for the Phoenix Mercury in the Women's National Basketball Association (WNBA).

At a height of 203 cm, she has been the fifth-tallest player in the league (along with Liz Cambage,  Zheng Haixia and Lindsay Taylor). Margo Dydek, 7 ft 2 in (218 cm), Bernadett Határ, 6 ft 10.5 in (210 cm), Han Xu, 6 ft 10 in (208 cm), and Brittney Griner, 6 ft 9 in (206 cm), are taller than her. Heidi Gillingham, also 6 ft 10 in, and Allyssa DeHaan, 6 ft 9 in as well, never played in the WNBA. She wears size 15 (US) / 48 (EU) shoes. Though in the Russian national team, she has been overtaken by Ekaterina Lisina in being the tallest member.

Stepanova was born in the village of Shpakovskoye (now the town of Mikhaylovsk, in Stavropol Krai of the former Russian Soviet Federative Socialist Republic of the Soviet Union, and grew up in Tosno, Leningrad Oblast.

Honours and awards
 Honoured Master of Sports of Russia
 Medal of the Order "For Merit to the Fatherland", 1st class (2 August 2009) - for outstanding contribution to the development of physical culture and sports, high achievements in sports at the Games of the XXIX Olympiad in Beijing in 2008
3× FIBA Europe Women's Player of the Year (2005, 2006, 2008)

External links
WNBA Player Profile

1979 births
Living people
Basketball players at the 1996 Summer Olympics
Basketball players at the 2000 Summer Olympics
Basketball players at the 2004 Summer Olympics
Basketball players at the 2008 Summer Olympics
Centers (basketball)
Medalists at the 2004 Summer Olympics
Medalists at the 2008 Summer Olympics
Olympic basketball players of Russia
Olympic bronze medalists for Russia
Olympic medalists in basketball
People from Stavropol Krai
Phoenix Mercury draft picks
Phoenix Mercury players
Recipients of the Medal of the Order "For Merit to the Fatherland" I class
Russian expatriate basketball people in the United States
Russian women's basketball players
Sportspeople from Stavropol Krai